The North Korea women's national handball team represents North Korea in international handball and is controlled by the Handball Association of the DPR Korea.

North Korea attended for the first time an international competition when they participated at the 2010 Asian Women's Handball Championship, where they finished fifth.

Asian Championship record
 1991 – 4th
 1993 – 3rd
 1999 – 4th
 2000 – 3rd
 2010 – 5th
 2012 – 5th

References

External links
IHF profile

National team
Korea, North
Handball